is a Japanese voice actor who is contracted to I'm Enterprise. He was born in Nagoya, Aichi.

Filmography

Anime
2002
Midnight Horror School – Borocca
Princess Tutu – Funeral Attendee (ep 4), Townsperson B (ep 6)

2003
BASToF Syndrome – Fake
Scrapped Princess – Forsyth

2004
Uta∽Kata – Kōji (ep 3)
Destiny of the Shrine Maiden – Souma Oogami
Monkey Turn – Takehiro Doguchi
Monkey Turn V – Takehiro Doguchi
Rozen Maiden – Yamamoto (ep. 5-10)

2005
Glass Mask – Gotou (ep 11-14), Grand chamberlain (ep 15)
Canvas 2: Niji Iro no Sketch – Shouta Hajizume
Gunparade Orchestra – Hiroshi Ishizuka
Best Student Council – Friend B (ep 8), Male Student 3 (ep 10), Trainee (ep 9)
Shakugan no Shana – Male Student A (ep 9)
Shuffle! – Father (ep 17)
ToHeart2 – Male Student (ep 3)
Trinity Blood – Tom (ep 21)
Fushigiboshi no Futago Hime – Haru
Honey and Clover – Friend C (ep 1)
Rozen Maiden: Träumend – Yamamoto, Earl of the Great Egret (ep 10)

2006
Pumpkin Scissors – Hans
Disgaea – Prinny, Raminton
MÄR – Mercury
Wan Wan Serebu Soreyuke! Tetsunoshin – Hanzo

2007
Gintama – Legendary Mahjong Player (ep 49)
Zombie-Loan – Yoshizumi
Kishin Taisen Gigantic Formula – Yohichi Yoshino
Shattered Angels – Jin Oogami, DJ (ep 8)
Goshūshō-sama Ninomiya-kun – Shungo Ninomiya
Kodomo no Jikan – Daisuke Aoki
Shugo Chara! – Yū Nikaido
Sky Girls – Rei Hizuki
Tactical Roar – Coleman/Coleman II executive officer (eps 5-12)
Deltora Quest – Manus

2008
Aria the Origination – Underclassman D (ep 9)
Golgo 13 – Husband (ep 10)
Shugo Chara!! Doki – Yū Nikaidō
Toradora! – Ryūji Takasu
Nogizaka Haruka no Himitsu – Shute Sutherland, Takashi Ogasawara

2009
Asura Cryin' – Shuu Mahiwa
Asura Cryin' 2 – Shuu Mahiwa
Umi Monogatari ~Anata ga Ite Kureta Koto~ – Sam
Guin Saga – Simon (ep 14)
Hell Girl: Three Vessels – Tomohide Matsuda (ep 23)
Samurai Harem: Asu no Yoichi – Uzumaru Mizunagi (ep 7)
Sora no Manimani – Takeyasu Roma
Nogizaka Haruka no Himitsu: Purezza – Shute Sutherland

2010
Inazuma Eleven – Teres Tolue, Goushu Flare, Winel (ep 109)
Ore no Imōto ga Konnani Kawaii Wake ga Nai – Kōhei Akagi
The Legend of the Legendary Heroes – Shuss Shiraz
A Certain Scientific Railgun – Teacher Daigo (eps 18-20)
Nura: Rise of the Yokai Clan – Karasu Tengu
Fairy Tail – Racer
Mayoi Neko Overrun! – Daigorō Kōya

2011
Is This a Zombie? – Ayumu Aikawa
Tamayura - Hitotose – Kazutarō Dōgō
Nura: Rise of the Yokai Clan: Demon Capital – Karasu Tengu
Hanasaku Iroha – Tōru Miyagishi
Aria the Scarlet Ammo – Kinji Tōyama
Beyblade: Metal Fury – Cycnus

2012
Cardfight!! Vanguard: Asia Circuit Hen – Crystal
Kuromajyo-san ga Tōru!! – Matsuoka-sensei
Is This a Zombie? of the Dead – Ayumu Aikawa
Say "I love you." – Masashi Tachikawa
Listen to Me, Girls. I Am Your Father! – Shuntarō Sako
Btooom! – Hitoshi Kakimoto

2013
Cardfight!! Vanguard: Link Joker Hen – Vice President Itsuki Suwabe
Samurai Flamenco – Young Man (ep 6)
Tamayura - More Aggressive – Kazutarō Dōgō
A Certain Scientific Railgun S – Haruki Aritomi
Nagi no Asukara – Itaru Shiodome
Puchimas! Petit Idolmaster - Producer

2014
Akame ga KILL! – Run
One Week Friends – Jun Inoue, Classmate (ep 5)
Cardfight!! Vanguard: Legion Mate-Hen – Vice Chairman Itsuki Suwabe
Recently, My Sister Is Unusual – Yūya Kanzaki
Shirobako – Yuuichirou Shimoyanagi
Z/X Ignition – Sir Garmatha
Daitoshokan no Hitsujikai – Kyōtarō Kakei
DRAMAtical Murder – Virus
Haikyu!! – Takehito Sasaya (eps 17-18)
Chaika - The Coffin Princess – Toru Acura
Chaika - The Coffin Princess Avenging Battle – Toru Acura
Pokémon XY – Hajime
Magimoji Rurumo – Senpai
Love Stage!! – Tenma Hidaka
Log Horizon 2 – Roreil Dawn

2015
Aria the Scarlet Ammo AA – Kinji Tōyama
Assassination Classroom – Ryūnosuke Chiba
Itoshi no Muco – Ushikō-san
Overlord – Herohero
Charlotte – Yoshiyuki Ōmura
Food Wars: Shokugeki no Soma – Hitoshi Sekimori
Death Parade – Shigeru Miura
Gangsta – Emilio Benedetto
The Kindaichi Case Files – Hikaru Tsukimizato (eps 38-41)
Battle Spirits Burning Soul – Hanzō Hyakki
Monster Musume – Kimihito Kurusu
Comet Lucifer – Alfried Maccaran
Is It Wrong to Try to Pick Up Girls in a Dungeon? – Takemikazuchi

2016
Alderamin on the Sky – Matthew Tetdrich
Assassination Classroom Second Season – Ryūnosuke Chiba
Drifters – Shara
The Lost Village – Manbe and Yottsun
Lostorage incited WIXOSS – Sō Sumida
Regalia: The Three Sacred Stars – Johnny Muppet
Tōken Ranbu: Hanamaru – Nikkari Aoe
Shūmatsu no Izetta – Tobias
Trickster – Naoki Aragaki

2017
The Eccentric Family – Junior
Koro-sensei Q! - Ryūnosuke Chiba 
ACCA: 13-Territory Inspection Dept. – Harrier (ep 10)
Kirakira PreCure a la Mode – Daisuke Tatsumi
Rin-ne – Suguru Egawa
Knight's & Magic – Knut Dixgard (young)
Sagrada Reset – Seijirō Urachi
Blood Blockade Battlefront & Beyond – Yurian (Ep. 6)
Tomica Hyper Rescue Drive Head Kidō Kyūkyū Keisatsu – Hayato Isurugi

2018
The Ryuo's Work Is Never Done! – Yoshitsune Kuruno 
Record of Grancrest War – Jade
JoJo's Bizarre Adventure: Golden Wind –   Melone / Baby Face
Sirius the Jaeger – Hideomi Iba
Chio's School Road – Salaryman
Ulysses: Jeanne d'Arc and the Alchemist Knight – Alençon

2019
Grimms Notes The Animation – Robin Hood
High School Prodigies Have It Easy Even In Another World – Masato Sanada

2020
Interspecies Reviewers – Stunk
Auto Boy - Carl from Mobile Land – Polly
Boruto: Naruto Next Generations – Kankitsu Akitsuki

2021
Yatogame-chan Kansatsu Nikki 3 Satsume – Masahide Tsuji
My Hero Academia Season 5 – Koku Hanabata

2022
Love After World Domination – Daigo Todoroki
Extreme Hearts – Shinji Ibuki
Bocchi The Rock! - Naoki Gotō

2023
Mahō Shōjo Magical Destroyers – Military Otaku

Original video animation (OVA)
Kodomo no Jikan Nigakki (xxxx) – Daisuke Aoki
Kodomo no Jikan: Anata ga Watashi ni Kureta Mono (xxxx) – Daisuke Aoki
Memories Off (xxxx) – Shin Inaho
Memories Off 2nd (xxxx) – Shin Inaho
Memories Off 3.5 - Omoide no Kanata e (xxxx) – Shin Inaho
Nana to Kaoru (xxxx) – Kaoru Sugimura
Utawarerumono (xxxx) – Gomuta
Kagaku na Yatsura (xxxx) – Haruki Komaba
Thus Spoke Kishibe Rohan (2018) - Gunpei Kamafusa (ep. 2)

Theatrical animation
Hanasaku Iroha: Home Sweet Home (2013) – Tōru Miyagishi

Drama CDs

Akiyama-kun – Yuuji Akiyama
Iberiko Buta to Koi to Tsubaki – Tsubaki
Kannazuki no Miko: Kimi no Mau Butai – Souma Oogami
NightS - Reply – Seki
Otaku no Musume-san – Nitta Chihiro (Nicchi-senpai)
Subete no Koi wa Yamai Kara – Shiina
Utawareru Mono Original Drama: Tuskuru no Nairan – Kimamaw
Yandere Kanojo – Tanaka Manabu

Video games

Akiba's Trip – Nobu-kun
Cross Edge – Prinny
Dengeki Gakuen: Cross of Venus – Ryuuji Takasu
Disgaea 2 – Prinny and Shura -n
Disgaea 5: Alliance of Vengeance - Christo and Prinny
Disgaea: Hour of Darkness – Prinny and Seraph Lammington
Disgaea D2: A Brighter Darkness - Seraph Lammington
Dragon Ball Xenoverse – Time Patroller (Male 7)
Eve: Ghost Enemies – Julio Furio
Fire Emblem: Path of Radiance, Fire Emblem: Radiant Dawn and Super Smash Bros. Ultimate – Black Knight
Fire Emblem: Radiant Dawn – Zelgius
Fire Emblem Heroes – Black Knight, Eldigan, Jeorge, Karel, Oscar, Sothe and Zelgius 
Genji: Dawn of the Samurai – Saburouta
GetAmped2 – Mike Davis
Gokuraku Parodius – Pentarou and Nohusuky
Granado Espada – Gavin
Grand Chase: Dimensional Chaser - Ercknard Sieghart
Ikemen Royal Palace: Cinderella in Midnight – Giles Christophe
Inazuma Eleven 3 Sekai e no Chousen – Teres Torue
Memories Off series — Shin Inaho (He has also voiced several other characters that appeared in the same series, not only Shin)
Phantom Brave – Raphael
Samurai Spirits Tenkaichi Kenkyakuden – Galford D. Weller, Sogetsu Kazama, and Shiro Tokisada Amakusa
Tears to Tiara II: Heir of the Overlord – Dion
Tori no Hoshi: Aerial Planet – Prinny
Touken Ranbu – Nikkari Aoe
Trinity Universe – Prinny

Tokusatsu
Kamen Rider × Kamen Rider Wizard & Fourze: Movie War Ultimatum (xxxx) – Other Kamen Riders (Voice of Atsushi Tamaru and Hideki Tasaka)

Adult visual novels

Under  name.

AliveZ – Mukuro Kanza
eden* PLUS+MOSAIC – Ryō Haruna
Secret Game CODE: Revise – Shuhei Fujita
Sugar Coat Freaks – Gino Gransyrto Ruritania
Pastel Chime Continue – Huge Baret
Pascha C++ – Huge Baret
Full Ani – Yū Morozumi
DRAMAtical Murder – Virus

Dubbing
August – Joshua Sterling (Adam Scott)
The Conclave – Rodrigo Borgia
Hot Wheels AcceleRacers – Kurt Wylde
Hot Wheels World Race – Kurt Wylde
Kamen Rider: Dragon Knight – Brandon
Teen Knight – Ben
Wolf Creek – Ben Mitchell

Other appearances

Radio

 (August 30, 2006 — present)

References

External links
 
Junji Majima at Ryu's Seiyuu Info

1978 births
Japanese male video game actors
Japanese male voice actors
Living people
Male voice actors from Nagoya
20th-century Japanese male actors
21st-century Japanese male actors
I'm Enterprise voice actors